"Miserable Man" is a song by American singer-songwriter David Kushner, released as a single on January 7, 2022, through EQT Recordings and Virgin Records internationally. It was written by Kushner and co-produced by Kushner and Abe Parker. The song went viral on TikTok and subsequently reached the top 20 in Ireland and Norway, as well as the top 40 in Australia, New Zealand and the UK.

Personnel
 David Kushner – vocals, production 
 Abe Parker – mixing, production
 Alexander Wright – mastering

Charts

References

2022 singles
2022 songs
Virgin Records singles